John Francis Harvey  (21 February 1938 – 5 December 2020) was an Australian racing driver. He was a top Speedcar driver for many years in the 1950s and 1960s, winning many championship races including the NSW Championship for three successive years and the Victorian Championship twice before turning his skills to road racing where he had a long and successful career until his retirement at the end of 1988. In 1987 John made history driving the General Motors Sunraycer to victory in the inaugural World Solar Challenge from Darwin to Adelaide, the first international race for purely solar powered cars.

Career

Despite being regarded as one of the best Speedcar drivers in Australia, Harvey switched from speedway to road racing in 1964 following the deaths of a few friends in Speedcar racing, as well as a contentious 6-month suspension received from the Sydney-based National Speedcar Club officials after he was alleged to spin fellow driver Al Staples in a scratch race at the Sydney Showground Speedway. Although this decision was later reverted to no suspension at the drivers' meeting, Harvey decided to opt-out of Speedway to go road racing. He would make a short-lived comeback to racing speedcars in 1974 at the Liverpool Speedway in western Sydney after the track promoters changed the  D-shaped oval from a dirt track to a bitumen track, once again racing for the same car owner he had in the 1960s, Ronald Mackay.

Harvey drove cars such as the Austin Cooper S and Brabham BT14 Ford 1.5 litre. Harvey won the 1966 Australian 1½ Litre Championship in the Brabham and in the same year finished runner up in the Australian Drivers' Championship for 2.5 litre Australian National Formula cars in the same car, competing against much more powerful machinery, also winning the NSW 1.5 litre Road Racing Championship. He began involvement with Bob Jane's racing team in 1967 and moved to Melbourne. Harvey won the 1971 and 1972 Australian Sports Car Championships driving the McLaren M6B Repco V8 for Bob Jane. He drove Jane's Repco V8 powered Holden Torana in Sports Sedan racing in the early 1970s, winning both the Toby Lee Series at Oran Park and the Marlboro Series at Calder Park Raceway in 1973.

In 1976, Harvey won the first round of the Australian Touring Car Championship in a one-off drive in a B&D Autos-sponsored Torana L34 at Symmons Plains. Later in the year Harvey was signed up to co-drive with Colin Bond in the Holden Dealer Team Torana L34 which finished a close second in the Bathurst 1000.

The race-winning #7 Holden was accidentally credited with an extra lap, putting it ahead of the #1 Holden. The error was picked up after the race and the relevant race official offered the Holden Dealer Team, the official factory team, the right to appeal. However, the #7 car was entered by Ron Hodgson Motors, one of Holden's biggest dealerships. The Holden hierarchy decided it would be good 'politic' to let  Bob Morris and British sportscar racer John Fitzpatrick  keep the win. Holden apologised to John Harvey for this at a testimonial dinner in 2002.

With Bond leaving the Holden team at the end of 1976, Harvey then became the lead driver for the 1977 season.

In 1978, Peter Brock re-joined the Holden Dealer Team and became No.1 driver with Harvey driving the No.2 car. This established the pattern for almost a decade. The Harvey car effectively became Brock's backup, notably winning the 1978 Rothmans 500 event at Oran Park teamed with Charlie O'Brien. In 1980 Peter Brock took over the Holden Dealer Team, deciding John Harvey would not contest the ATCC races and contest only the endurance races at the end of the year. Peter Brock teamed with John Harvey (1980, 1981) for the CRC 300, winning both. This arrangement continued until the advent of Group A in Australia in 1985, though Harvey did run in rounds of the 1984 ATCC, driving Brock's #05 when Brock and Perkins were attempting to win Le Mans. Harvey would then run selected rounds in the 1985 ATCC, as well as rounds of the 1986 ATCC.

Harvey's biggest win came with the HDT at the 1983 James Hardie 1000. Originally to be partnered with Brock's brother Phil, Harvey qualified his #25 Holden VH Commodore (the car in which Brock and Perkins had won the 1982 race) in 5th place (Brock claimed pole in #05). After just eight laps, Brock's car blew its engine, seemingly putting him and Perkins out of the race. However, due to the pair being cross-entered in #25, Brock and Perkins then took over from Harvey for the rest of the race (leaving Phil Brock without a drive). The race win was controversial at the time as many felt Brock and Perkins should not have been allowed to move into the HDT's second car after theirs retired. Under race rules at the time, however, cross-entering was allowed and had actually been used in previous 1000s, though this was the first time drivers had moved from one car to another and had gone on to win the race.

Harvey would go on to finish second at Bathurst the following year in the last race for the Group C touring cars in what was a 1-2 form finish for the Dealer Team with Brock/Perkins bringing in their VK Commodore home first in front of Harvey's co-driver, 25-year-old Tasmanian David “Skippy” Parsons. Harvey would finish second again two years later for the HDT. Driving a VK Commodore SS Group A, he teamed with HDT driver/engineer Neal Lowe to finish second behind the Commodore of Allan Grice and Graeme Bailey.
 
Harvey won the 1986 Pukekohe 500 with Neal Lowe in their new Group A SS VK Commodore, and the pair finished second to HDT teammates Brock and Allan Moffat at the 1987 Nissan 500 Wellington.

Harvey split with Brock by 1987, being unhappy with Brock's flirtation with ‘New Age’ ideas like his ‘Energy Polariser’. Harvey told his side of the story of the split in Bill Tuckey's 1987 book The Rise and Fall of Peter Brock.

In March 1987, Harvey teamed up with Allan Moffat to drive their HDT built (and covertly bought by Moffat) Holden VL Commodore SS Group A to victory in the first round of the 1987 World Touring Car Championship at the famous Monza circuit in Italy. After finishing seventh, the pair were promoted as the first six BMW Motorsport backed BMW M3's were disqualified from the race for being some 50–80  kg underweight (after a protest from a privateer M3 team, the works M3's were found to have been fitted with lightweight carbon-fibre and kevlar body panels). Later at the Spa, 24 Hours in August, Moffat, and Harvey achieved a class win and finished 4th outright behind the works BMW Team M3's. Sydney driver Tony Mulvihill had also been listed to drive the #5 Rothmans sponsored Commodore at Spa, though he was caught out by the notorious Ardennes weather in qualifying and failed to qualify for the race. This forced Moffat and Harvey to drive the 24 hours with just the two of them while most other teams used at least 3 drivers.

After Moffat abandoned the Commodore in favor of Andy Rouse's Ford Sierra RS500, Harvey missed the 1987 James Hardie 1000 which was a round of the WTCC. It was the first Bathurst race Harvey had missed since 1972. The race was also the 9th and last Bathurst 1000 win for his longtime teammate Peter Brock. 

Shortly after the Brock breakup John was appointed lead driver of the GM Sunraycer team and made two trips to the US for testing and race team preparation. He was recommended for his professionalism and discipline by Ray Borrett (Holden's reliability and “skunkworks” motor sport engineer). Ray was involved in  the development of Sunraycer in the US and became the race team manager.

Harvey's last Bathurst 1000 was in 1988 where he teamed with Kevin Bartlett in a Holden VL Commodore SS Group A SV to finish in 14th after qualifying 22nd. Early in the race, Harvey had been dicing with Brock, now racing a BMW M3. Harvey almost didn't get to drive in the 1988 race. At the time he was working for the Tom Walkinshaw owned Holden Special Vehicles and Walkinshaw had a rule that barring himself, senior management could not participate in dangerous activities such as being a race driver. Walkinshaw finally relented and let Harvey race at Bathurst, originally offering him the lead driver role in the HSV team's 3rd car, something which Harvey turned down stating that "I had been the number two behind Brock for eight years and I wasn't about to become the number three".

During Round 7 of the 1988 Australian Touring Car Championship at Sandown, and despite being part of the management team at HSV, Harvey was on hand to be part of Allan Moffat's team for the weekend (complete with a Moffat team ANZ Bank jacket). From 1988 Moffat was racing a Ford Sierra RS500 built by Swiss ace Ruedi Eggenberger. Ironically, Harvey's old HDT teammate Larry Perkins through his Perkins Engineering was running the factory-backed Holden team in the 1988 ATCC under the name of Holden Special Vehicles.

In February 1988, Harvey drove the new VL Commodore SS Group A SV which was the pace car driver for the first-ever NASCAR race held outside of North America, the Goodyear NASCAR 500 held at the then-new, A$54 million Calder Park Thunderdome in Melbourne.

Following the 1988 Tooheys 1000, Harvey retired from competitive motorsport to concentrate on his work with Holden and HSV.

In 2018, CAMS awarded Harvey a place in the Motor Sport Hall of Fame.

In the 2020 Australia Day Honours, Harvey was awarded the Medal of the Order of Australia for service to motor sports.

Death
Harvey died on 5 December 2020, aged 82, from a battle with lung cancer.

Career results

Complete Australian Touring Car Championship results
(key) (Races in bold indicate pole position) (Races in italics indicate fastest lap)

Complete FIA European Touring Car Championship results
(key) (Races in bold indicate pole position) (Races in italics indicate fastest lap)

Complete World Touring Car Championship results
(key) (Races in bold indicate pole position) (Races in italics indicate fastest lap)

† Not registered for series & points

Complete Asia-Pacific Touring Car Championship results
(key) (Races in bold indicate pole position) (Races in italics indicate fastest lap)

Complete Bathurst 1000 results

Complete Sandown Endurance results

Complete Spa 24 Hours results

References

Australia's Greatest Motor Race 1960-1999 (Chevron) © 2000
Australian Competition Yearbook 1974
Ten Top Drivers (Forsyth Publications) 1979
The Rise and Fall of Peter Brock (Bill Tuckey) 1987
Sunraycer Bill Tuckey, Chevron Publishing Group.

1938 births
2020 deaths
Australian Touring Car Championship drivers
Bathurst 1000 winners
Racing drivers from Sydney
Recipients of the Medal of the Order of Australia
Sportsmen from New South Wales
Tasman Series drivers
World Touring Car Championship drivers
24 Hours of Spa drivers
Deaths from lung cancer
Deaths from cancer in Victoria (Australia)
Australian Endurance Championship drivers